Niederbipp railway station is a railway station in the municipality of Niederbipp, in the Swiss canton of Bern. It is an intermediate stop on the standard gauge Jura Foot line of Swiss Federal Railways. It is also located at the junction of the  gauge Langenthal–Oensingen and Solothurn–Niederbipp lines of Aare Seeland mobil.

Services
 the following services stop at Niederbipp:

References

External links 
 
 

Railway stations in the canton of Bern
Swiss Federal Railways stations